Anaphosia eurygrapha is a moth of the family Erebidae. It was described by George Hampson in 1910. It is found in the Democratic Republic of the Congo and Zambia.

References

Moths described in 1910
Lithosiini
Moths of Africa